The Sheffield Brightside by-election of 15 June 1968 was held after the death of Labour MP (MP) Richard Winterbottom.
The seat was very safe, having been won by Labour at the 1966 United Kingdom general election by over 19,000 votes

Candidates
Labour chose Edward Griffiths to defend their seat, who was an industrial chemist and a worker director at the British Steel Corporation
Colin Renfrew, for the Conservatives, was lecturer in the Department of Prehistory and Archaeology at the University of Sheffield
Robert Wilkinson was chosen as the candidate for the Communists
Ronald Guest, and Lt-Col H L Lambert, stood as independents.

Result of the previous general election

Result of the by-election

References

1968 in England
1968 elections in the United Kingdom
By-elections to the Parliament of the United Kingdom in Sheffield constituencies
1960s in Sheffield
June 1968 events in the United Kingdom